The CrossFit Games is an annual athletic competition owned and operated by CrossFit, LLC. Athletes compete in a series of events at the Games, which may be various standard CrossFit workouts consisting of metabolic conditioning exercises, weightlifting, and gymnastics movements, as well as a range of activities from other sports such as swimming and cycling. The events generally are not revealed before the Games, can include unexpected elements to challenge the athletes' readiness to compete, and they are designed to test the athletes' fitness using CrossFit's own criteria. Winners of the CrossFit Games earn cash prizes and the title of "Fittest on Earth."

The competition started in 2007 and has been held every year since, normally in the summer. The first competition was held at a ranch in Aromas, California, with small groups of participants and spectators, but the CrossFit Games rapidly grew, and within a few years, the competition was moved to larger venues at the Home Depot Center in Carson, California, followed by the Alliant Energy Center in Madison, Wisconsin. The first qualification stage for the Games, the Open, is billed as the largest participatory sporting event in the world, with over 415,000 athletes signing up to compete in 2018. The Games were sponsored by Reebok from 2011 to 2020, and by Nobull starting 2021. A few athletes have dominated in the Games' history; they are Rich Froning (four wins) and Mat Fraser (five wins) in the men's competition, and Tia-Clair Toomey (six wins) in the women's.

History

The CrossFit Games has its origin in early 2007 when the then director of training of CrossFit Dave Castro invited CrossFit founder Greg Glassman to his family ranch in Aromas, California, and Glassman suggested holding a "Woodstock of Fitness" at the ranch for the CrossFit community.
In July 2007, the inaugural CrossFit Games, which had the feel of a backyard barbecue with a few sporting events thrown in, took place at the ranch in Aromas.  Around 70 athletes and 150 spectators turned up for the first Games. For the first two years of competition, participation was open to anyone who made it to Aromas. The athletes with the best individual combined score in a series of events would be crowned the winners, and an Affiliate Cup was also awarded to the group from one CrossFit gym that had the best combined individual standings. The number of participants increased rapidly, and in 2009, a qualification stage called the Regionals was introduced to select the best competitors for the Games. The CrossFit Games also added a separate set of team-based events for the Affiliate Cup, marking the first use of a designated Team Division, with teams of four (two men and two women).

Interest and participation in the event continued to grow, and in 2010, the qualification was adjusted to include multiple Sectionals, a series of events open to all athletes who wanted to qualify for one of the 17 Regionals. The 17 regions divided Canada and the United States into 12 regions, with the remaining regions roughly corresponding to the five other populated continents. The attendance at the Games also outgrew the ranch in Aromas, and the Games venue was moved to the Home Depot Center (later called the StubHub Center) in Carson, California. The Games also expanded the Team Division to groups of six athletes and added a Masters Division for individual men and women aged 55 and up.

In 2011, the open participation Sectionals were replaced by an online qualification called the Open. In the first year of the Open, 26,000 athletes signed up to compete. Participation in the Open steadily increased, rising from 69,000 in 2012 to 209,585 in 2014. The Open has since been described as the largest participatory sporting event in the world, reaching a peak of 415,000 participants in 2018. The number of registered athletes in the Open declined in the next two years down to 239,106 in 2020, which may be due to changes of the 2019 Games and the scheduling of the 2020 Open, but has steadily increased in the following years, to over 323,000 in 2023.

In 2015, the qualification format was reorganized from 17 Regionals to eight "Super-Regionals". Each Super-Regional included qualifiers from two or three of the previously defined regions, with a total of 40 or 50 athletes participating at each event.

Following seven years in Carson, the Games moved to the grounds of the Alliant Energy Center in Madison, Wisconsin, in 2017. The next year, the qualifying Regionals were once again realigned to reflect the increasing competitiveness and popularity outside of Canada and the U.S. In 2018, there were nine Regionals hosted among 18 redefined regions, with Europe increasing to three regions, Central America split from South America, and the elimination of the Northern and Southern California regions.

CrossFit, Inc. founder Greg Glassman overhauled the format for the 2019 Games, replacing the Regionals with CrossFit-sanctioned international qualifying events called Sanctionals. As part of the changes, the 2019 Games athletes can qualify by winning one of the Sanctionals, or were the top athlete from one of the recognized countries in the CrossFit Open, or a top-20 overall finisher in the CrossFit Open, or by being one of the up to four at-large athletes chosen by CrossFit. Teams also no longer needed to be created from one CrossFit-affiliated gym and could be formed from any group of four competitors.

In 2020, the qualifying events proceeded as scheduled until March 2020 when the effects of the COVID-19 pandemic caused events to be cancelled amid social distancing requirements and travel restrictions for international competitors. The Games format was then altered, and 30 men and 30 women were invited to compete in an online-only first stage with the top five qualifying for the final stage. As spectators would not be allowed at any venues during the pandemic, the final stage was hosted at its original location at the CrossFit Ranch in Aromas. There were no teams, masters, or teens events.

With the ongoing effects of the pandemic, the 2021 qualification format was made more inclusive during the Open, allowing competitors who may not be able travel to qualifying events to advance in the competition season by participating in a new online Quarterfinal, in a format similar to that previously used for age-group qualifiers. However, the Games also removed the national champion Open qualification to have a smaller field of invitees to the Games. Ten Semifinals that are a mix of the Regionals and Sanctionals were introduced, as well as a final last-chance online qualifier for semifinal athletes who narrowly missed Games qualification. The Games also returned the team format to affiliate-based qualification, and added a new adaptive athlete division.

In January 2022, CrossFit CEO Eric Roza fired CrossFit Games' director Dave Castro after 15 years of programming the event, replacing him with Justin Bergh as General Manager Of Sport and Adrian Bozman as Director of Competition.

A worldwide ranking of athletes was introduced for the 2023 Games based on the performance of the athletes in all stages of the previous two Games. This ranking system would be used to determine any additional qualifying spots for the CrossFit Games in a revamped qualification process.

Sponsorship and prize money

Participation and sponsorship have grown rapidly since the inception of the Games. The Games has always awarded an equal sum in prize money to the male and female individual winners, starting with $500 at the inaugural Games, increasing to $300,000 in 2019. The prize purse of the 2010 Games was sponsored by Progenex that provided $25,000 for the winners. The following year saw the largest jump in prize money when Reebok sponsored its first Games, and the prize money for first place in 2011 increased to $250,000. The total prize payout in 2016 was $2,200,000, rising to 3 million in 2020. The prize payout increased again in 2021 when Nobull became the title sponsor of the Games.

Qualification
The CrossFit Games is the culmination of the CrossFit season that starts with the qualification stage. In the first two CrossFit Games, no qualification for competitors was necessary; athletes who wanted to participate in the Games could register and turn up on the day to compete. However, with an increasing number of participants, a qualification process, the Regionals, was initiated in 2009 to winnow down the number of athletes who could take part in the Games. This was further expanded into a two-stage process in 2010 with the introduction of Sectionals where competitors were first selected to compete in the Regionals. The Sectionals became the Open the following year, and between 2011 and 2018, all athletes had to go through the same two-stage qualification process, the Open and Regionals, apart from a few who received special invites in some years. In the 2019 CrossFit Games, the qualification process was modified, and competitors had three separate ways to qualify: the Open, sanctioned events, and by invitation. In 2021, the Open once again reverted to its role as the first stage of competition that feeds the subsequent rounds, the Quarterfinals and Semifinals, in an expanded three-stage continent-based qualification system.

The Open

The Open was introduced in 2011 and participation is open to anyone over a certain age limit (14 since 2015) and at any skill level. The Open is held over a number of weeks, and a series of workouts are released weekly for competitors to complete. Athletes who wish to progress further in individual competitions need to perform the workouts as prescribed ("Rx'd"), but others who want to take part only in the Open can "scale" their workouts to be easier to suit their ability, or choose the foundation or equipment-free options introduced in 2021. Each week competitors perform the workouts and submit their scores online before a specified time supported by either videos of their workouts or validations by a CrossFit affiliate. In every event, the competitors are ranked according to their performance with points awarded directly corresponding to their rank (i.e. one point for first, two for second, etc.), and the winner is the one with the lowest cumulative points over the course of the Open.

From 2011 to 2019, the Open was usually held over five weeks in February and March with a new workout released each week, and athletes had to submit their score for each workout usually four days later. For the 2020 season, the Open moved forward to October 2019 as part of the overhaul for Games qualifications so that it took place before any of the sanctioned events. It has been moved back to March since the 2021 season, but the number of workouts have been reduced to three or four to be completed in three weeks.

In 2019, the top athlete from each country (the national champion) and the top 20 overall Open finishers qualified directly to the Games. This was also planned for 2020, but the COVID-19 pandemic travel restrictions led to only 20 men and 20 women from the Open being invited to an online competition as the first stage of the Games itself, and no national champion has been invited to the Games since.

In 2021, the Open reverted back to be the starting point of the competition, but the number of weeks was reduced to three with only four workouts held, further reducing to three in 2022.

Quarterfinals
For the 2021 Games, the qualification system was again revamped, and a Quarterfinal stage was added between the Open and the Semifinals. Participants in the Open are separated on a continental basis, and only the top 10% on each continent qualify for the Quarterfinal in order to move on to the Semifinals.
The Quarterfinals start around a week and a half after the Open has finished, and are held online similar to the Open. The athletes are required to complete five workouts over 3 consecutive days after the workouts have been released.

Regionals, Sanctionals, and Semifinals

Between 2009 and 2018, competitors qualified for the Games through participation at CrossFit Games regional events around the world. The top men and women from the Sectional in 2010, and the Open from 2011 to 2018, participated in the Regionals to qualify for the Games.  There were 17 Regionals most years until 2015, when athletes from the 17 regions (later 18 regions) were funnelled into 8 or 9 Regional competitions. In 2011, the events in the Regionals were standardized.

For the 2019 Games, CrossFit, Inc. discontinued hosting the Regional qualifier and instead sanctioned independent fitness events as qualifiers separate from the Open. These events were trademarked as "Sanctionals" by CrossFit, LLC. Most of the sanctioned events were significant CrossFit competitions already widely participated in by CrossFit Games athletes around the world, such as Wodapalooza and Dubai CrossFit Championship, as well as the new Rogue Invitational. Each sanctioned event had its own rules for participation and separately programmed events. If an athlete or team won multiple sanctioned events, the runners-up from the later events would qualify to the Games. Twenty-eight sanctioned events were announced for the 2020 season, but many of them were cancelled due to the effects of the COVID-19 pandemic.

In 2021, the revamped Semifinals are a mix of the Regionals and Sanctionals, with 10 Semifinals scheduled in 6 continents. A last-chance online qualifier, last used in 2009, was reintroduced for semifinal athletes who narrowly missed a Games qualification. In 2022, CrossFit reintroduced identical workouts but only for two of the Semifinal events. This is further extended in 2023 when all the workouts for the semifinals would be standardized.

Invitation
From 2009 to 2011, special invites were given to the top 5 men and women from the preceding Games as well as the individual champions of all previous games. The special invites for previous champions were removed in 2012, although CrossFit  reserved the right to extend an invitation at any stage of the Games to any athlete, a right it exercised for two athletes in 2013. In 2019, the CrossFit Games had the option to invite up to four athletes who did not qualify for the Games in the Open or sanctioned events as an at-large bid.

Competition events

Athletes at the Games compete in a series of workouts and activities over the course of a few days. The events are generally not announced in advance before the Games; the Games is set up as a test of fitness, and the founder of CrossFit Greg Glassman believes that the fittest athletes should be able to handle any task given, athletes are therefore kept in the dark as to what they may face in the Games. They only learn about the events days, hours, or minutes beforehand, sometimes not knowing the details of the events even after they have started on the event. These events test the athletes on what CrossFit defines as the ten fitness domains: "cardiovascular/respiratory endurance, stamina, strength, flexibility, power, speed, coordination, agility, balance, and accuracy", so that the fittest athlete can be determined using CrossFit's own criteria. The first Games only had 3 events; in the following years, the number of events gradually increased, and the Games now typically have 12–15 events held over a period of three to five days. Each event is scored individually; since 2011 the scoring system awards 100 points for the winner of every event, with lower-placing athletes receiving fewer points according to a points table. The athlete with the best combined score across all events is declared the champion and the "Fittest on Earth".

The events are mostly an assortment of Crossfit workouts comprising exercises in metabolic conditioning (metcon), weightlifting, and gymnastics, which are the three CrossFit modalities. The standard CrossFit workouts are usually a combination of movements of different modalities, such as handstand push-up, pull-up, muscle-up, burpee, lunge, box-jump, rope-climb, double under, running, back squat and dumbbell push press. Each workout may involve a number of rounds and repetitions (reps) of different movements, for example, a workout may have a rep scheme comprising three rounds of 21-15-9 repetitions of each movement.  Workouts with "rounds for time" structure are won by competitors who can finish the rounds of workouts in the fastest time, while workouts in the "as many reps/rounds as possible" (AMRAP) format are won by those who complete the most reps or rounds within a set time. The workouts may be given specific names, for example, "Grace", "Fran", and "Amanda" from "The Girls" workouts, and "Murph" from the "Heroes" and tribute workouts. Events titled "Couplet" are composed of two different movements, while "Triplet" events have three. The "Chipper" events typically involve many different movements performed in sequence, while the "Ladder" events may involve increasing/decreasing number of reps or heavier/lighter weights in each succeeding round.

The Games often introduces some additional surprise elements that are not part of the typical CrossFit regimen to the events. These include obstacle courses, road cycling, ocean swimming, softball throwing, or ascending a pegboard. "Odd-objects" like yokes, sleds, and sandbags may also be introduced to the workouts; some of these the athletes would not have encountered before in a CrossFit gym, examples are the "Snail" (an object shaped like a bale of hay but partly filled with sand), the "Pig" (a heavy block encased in rubber), and the "Banger" (a metal block on a track hit with a hammer).

Divisions

Individual
The marquee events at the CrossFit Games are the men's and women's individual competitions. The first place prize for each paid out $300,000 in 2020, with that amount set to increase to $310,000 in 2021.

Team

Originally, teams were awarded the Affiliate Cup for having the best overall score from the individual athletes that had come from the same CrossFit-affiliated gym. In 2009, the Games began having a separate set of events for affiliate teams and consisted of four to six athletes from the same gym. The next season, the format was finalized to teams of three men and three women. In the 2018 games, each team was changed to four members, two men and two women. In 2019, CrossFit removed the stipulation that team members had to be from the same affiliate. Teams are subject to a similar qualification process as the individuals.

In 2021, the Games returned to affiliate-only teams and the Affiliate Cup.

Masters and Teens
The Games includes age-based divisions for younger and older competitors. Masters divisions were introduced at the 2010 Games. There are currently seven divisions each for women and men: 35–39, 40–44, 45–49, 50–54, 55–59, 60–64, and 65+.  Divisions for teenagers were introduced in 2015: the age ranges are 14–15 and 16–17, for both boys and girls.

Rather than regional events, masters and teen athletes qualify for the games by a second online competition following the Open. The top 200 athletes in each division worldwide are invited to compete in this qualifier, of which the top 10 advance to the Games.

Prior to the introduction of these secondary online qualifiers, masters and teens competitors qualified for the Games directly from the Open.

Adaptive
The adaptive divisions were introduced in the 2021 CrossFit Open for competitors with physical impairment. There are 16 adaptive divisions (eight each for men and women) with no separation by age, but all competitors must be at least 14 years of age. Three male and three female divisions participated at the Games, while the rest are tested virtually in the semifinals.

Controversies
Due to CrossFit's official partnership with Reebok, competitors at the 2015 Games were banned from wearing Nike footwear. Nike arranged for several trucks to be parked near the main entrance to the arena, which served as mobile billboards with the slogan "Don't ban our shoe, beat our shoe". The partnership also prohibits Nike from labeling its Metcon shoes as intended for CrossFit – the brand uses the term "high intensity training" instead.

CrossFit's decision to award winners of the 2016 Games with handguns resulted in widespread criticism from members and sponsors. Resulting protests forced the temporary closure of two CrossFit locations in New York City.

On June 6, 2020, CrossFit founder and CEO Greg Glassman was publicly criticized for his social media statements about the COVID-19 pandemic and the George Floyd protests resulting in many CrossFit-affiliated gyms around the world responded by ending their affiliation, Reebok announcing that they would end their corporate association after the 2020 Games, and several competitors boycotting the Games until he was removed from the company. On June 9, Glassman resigned as CEO and sold the company by the end of the month, leading to the boycotting athletes returning.

Athletes from Taiwan are required to compete under the People's Republic of China flag, rather than the Republic of China flag. SCMP reported that athletes have emailed CrossFit HQ, without any feedback.

Broadcasting and media 
In 2011, ESPN began to broadcast the CrossFit Games, with live coverage streamed through ESPN3, and some television coverage on ESPN2. As the event grew, ESPN expanded its television coverage; in 2014, the network entered into a multi-year deal to continue broadcasting the CrossFit Games, and coverage expanded to nine-and-a-half hours on ESPN and ESPN2 by 2015.  In 2017, the event began a new broadcast arrangement with CBS Sports, with television coverage on CBS Sports Network, and a total of 40 hours of digital streaming coverage. In 2019, CrossFit experimented with an open-source broadcasting system that allowed various partners to broadcast the Games, but live broadcast resumed on CBS Sports in 2020.

For many years CrossFit had its own media department that was responsible for creating and releasing media content related to the Games, including live streaming of the Games online through Facebook, YouTube and CrossFit websites, and content broadcast on ESPN and CBS. Events such as the Open workout announcements were broadcast live from 2013 to 2018, and featured two or more past CrossFit Games athletes competing head-to-head immediately following the workout description. During the 2018–19 restructuring, CrossFit dissolved its own media crew, relying instead on outside media outlets and production companies for coverage of the sport. For the next two years, Rogue Fitness broadcast the coverage of the Open workout announcement with competing athletes performing the workouts, and provided color commentary for the live stream of the Games. CrossFit resumed live streaming of its Open announcements in 2021.  CrossFit's media department also produced a number of documentary films on the Games, and its former employees continued to produce them independently after the department was dissolved.

Champions by year and category

Individual and Team champions

 
Masters men's champions
  
 
Masters women's champions

Teens champions

Adaptive divisions champions

See also
National Pro Grid League

References

External links

 Official website
 Leaderboard of previous competitions

International sports competitions hosted by the United States
CrossFit